Bloody Tourist is the debut album by Shinjuku Thief, released in 1992 through Extreme Records.

Track listing

Personnel 
Shinjuku Thief
Charles Tétaz
François Tétaz
Darrin Verhagen
Production and additional personnel
David Brown – shakuhachi
Jeremy Duff – bass guitar on "Komachi Ruins", "Feather Woman of the Jungle" and "Nkoma"
Andrew Entsch – acoustic bass guitar on "The Sacrifice"
Jim Glasson – tenor saxophone on "Feather Woman of the Jungle"
Richard Grant – photography, design
Garry Havrillay – mastering
Made Midri – vocals on "Open Wound"
Paul Schütze – production
Mark Stafford – guitar on "Komachi Ruins", "The Sacrifice" and "Graven Image"
Christopher Steller – programming on "Burden of Dreams"
Shinjuku Thief – production
David Yammouni – vocals on "Graven Image"

References

External links 
 

1992 debut albums
Extreme Records albums
Shinjuku Thief albums